Chittaranjan railway station, formerly known as Mihijam railway station, station code CRJ, is the railway station in Mihijam, Jamtara district in the Indian state of Jharkhand. Chittaranjan railway station lies on the Howrah–Delhi main line on the Mughalsarai–Patna section. The railway station is named after the Indian freedom fighter, Deshbandhu Chittaranjan Das.

Chittaranjan railway station serves Mihijam and Chittaranjan township. The railway station is located in Mihijam, which is in Jharkhand, whereas the township falls in West Bengal. The Chittaranjan railway station is in Howrah–Delhi main line at a distance of 237 km from Howrah. The nearest major railway junction is Asansol, 25 km away.

History

The earlier name of the station was Mihijam. When the Chittaranjan Locomotive Works was established at Chittaranjan, the station's name was changed to Chittaranjan.

Facilities 
The station is rated as NSG-5 category station having an income of 8 crores and above per year. The major facilities available are waiting rooms, retiring room, ramp, dormitory, computerized reservation counter, 2 Wheeler Vehicle parking. The station holds a Premium Lounge for Passengers and a Heritage Art Gallery for History Enthusiasts which depicts History of Indian Railways like feasibility studies and other information in pictorial form along with the description. The station also has free and fast Railwire WiFi.

Also as per the latest reports, escalator installation is planned and construction to start soon after tender. Coach indicators will be installed in coming days. The station  has a telephone booth, ATM counter, toilets, tea stall and book stall.

Platforms 
There are 3 platforms here. Platform no. 1 and 2 cater to down trains (Asansol/Dhanbad/Howrah/Sealdah/Kolkata bound trains) though platform no. 2 is predominantly used to the service of Express/Mail/Superfast trains whereas platform no. 1 is also used for EMU local trains, passenger trains, and low-priority express trains. Platform 3 is completely dedicated to up trains (New Delhi/Patna/Jhajha/Jasidih/Amritsar/Barauni/Raxaul bound trains). The platforms are connected by an over-bridge covered on either side to ensure the security of the passengers. Beyond platform no. 3 there is a raised platform for loading and unloading goods. This platform serves freight trains. A total of 5 tracks exist here 4 main + 1-yard track.

Trains 
Many passenger and express trains serve Chittaranjan station.

Nearest airports
The nearest airports to Chittaranjan station are:
Kazi Nazrul Islam Airport Durgapur 
Birsa Munda Airport, Ranchi  
Netaji Subhash Chandra Bose International Airport, Kolkata 
Gaya Airport 
Lok Nayak Jayaprakash Airport, Patna

See also 
 Chittaranjan Locomotive Works

Gallery

References

External links 
 Chittaranjan station map
 Official website of the Jamtara district

Railway stations in Jamtara district
Asansol railway division